Hostages is an American drama television series that aired on CBS as part of the 2013–14 American television season. Developed for American television by Alon Aranya and Jeffrey Nachmanoff, it is based on the Israeli series of the same name created by Omri Givon and Rotem Shamir and produced by Chaim Sharir, which premiered on October 13, 2013, almost three weeks after the American version's premiere. Jeffrey Nachmanoff wrote and directed the pilot episode for the American version. The series premiered on September 23, 2013 and ended on January 6, 2014.

On May 10, 2014, CBS cancelled the series after one season.

Plot
The family of a doctor is taken hostage by a team led by a rogue FBI agent the night before she is scheduled to perform surgery on the President of the United States. She is ordered by the kidnappers to assassinate the President during surgery in order to save her family.

Cast

Main
 Toni Collette as Dr. Ellen Sanders, a well respected thoracic surgeon at the Maryland College Hospital in Washington who is chosen to operate on the President of the United States.
 Dylan McDermott as FBI Special Agent Duncan Carlisle, leader of the team that takes the Sanders family hostage. His motivation is to help his sick wife Nina, who has leukemia. 
 Tate Donovan as Brian Sanders, husband of Ellen Sanders and the owner of a real estate firm in Washington. He is having an affair with his assistant, Samantha.
 Quinn Shephard as Morgan Sanders, teenage daughter of Ellen and Brian Sanders.
 Mateus Ward as Jake Sanders, teenage son of Ellen and Brian Sanders, and younger than Morgan.
 Billy Brown as Archer Petit, a member of the team that takes the Sanders family hostage. He and Duncan met 13 years ago after he was rescued from FARC guerrillas while working at the Colombian border.
 Sandrine Holt as Sandrine Renault, a member of the team that takes the Sanders family hostage. She and Archer met while in Afghanistan.
 Rhys Coiro as Kramer Delaney, a member of the team that takes the Sanders family hostage and Duncan's brother-in-law.
 James Naughton as President Paul Kincaid.

Recurring
 Hilarie Burton as Samantha, mistress and assistant of Brian Sanders
 Paul Calderon as Secret Service Agent Stan Hoffman, a hardworking family man assigned to the joint FBI–Secret Service task force tasked with investigating the threat on the President's life. 
 Jim True-Frost as Secret Service Agent Logan.
 Brian White as Colonel Thomas Blair, Marine and current NSA director. 
 Joanne Kelly as Vanessa Moore, sister of Mary Kincaid. 
 Jeremy Bobb as Quentin Creasy, Chief of Staff within the Kincaid administration. 
 Lola Cook as Sawyer Carlisle, Duncan's daughter.
 Larry Pine as Burton Delaney, Duncan's father-in-law and Paul Kincaid's adviser when he was a senator.
 Tyler Elliott Burke as Boyd Norton, Morgan's boyfriend. 
 Mary Elizabeth Mastrantonio as First Lady Mary Kincaid, wife of President Paul Kincaid.
 Francie Swift as Nina Carlisle, Duncan's sick wife.

International broadcasts
Hostages is broadcast internationally: in the UK on Channel 4, Australia on Nine Network, in Canada on CTV, in Latin America on Warner Channel, in the Netherlands on NET 5, in New Zealand on TV One, in Finland on MTV3, in South Africa on M-Net, in India on Zee Café, in France on Canal+, in Portugal on RTP2, in Austria on ORF 1, in Belgium on één in Spain on Antena 3 and in Slovenia on POP TV .

Episodes

Reception
The series received generally mixed reviews. Rotten Tomatoes reports that 57% of 42 reviews were positive, with the consensus: "Hostages has an intriguing premise and handsome production values, but its twisty plot sometimes strains credulity." David Hinckley of the New York Daily News gave the show 4 out of 5 stars. Robert Bianco of USA Today awarded it 3 out of 4 stars.

Awards and nominations

Locations recorded
A list of filming locations:
In New York
 Carle Place
 Carle Place High School
 Uniondale
RexCorp Plaza
Charles Lindbergh Boulevard
 Hicksville
 Hicksville Train Station
 East Meadow
 Eisenhower Park
 Long Island City
 Brooklyn (Greenpoint / Brooklyn Heights)
 White Plains
 Westchester County Airport

References

External links

 Hostages at TV by the Numbers

2013 American television series debuts
2014 American television series endings
2010s American drama television series
Serial drama television series
American television series based on Israeli television series
CBS original programming
English-language television shows
Hostage taking in fiction
Television series about cancer
Television series by Warner Bros. Television Studios
Television shows filmed in New York (state)
Television shows set in Washington, D.C.